Top Man may refer to:

 Top Man (film), 1943 American film
 Topman, stand-alone fashion business
 Top Man, a character in Mega Man 3
 "Top Man", a song by Blur from their 1995 album The Great Escape